Filip Alexander Ambrož (born 1 December 2003) is a Croatian footballer who plays for IFK Göteborg as a midfielder.

References

External links 
 
 Filip Ambrož at IFK Göteborg Database.

2003 births
Living people
Footballers from Gothenburg
Association football midfielders
Croatian footballers
Croatia youth international footballers
Swedish footballers
Swedish people of Croatian descent
IFK Göteborg players
NK Dugopolje players
Allsvenskan players
First Football League (Croatia) players